The Ho Chi Minh City–Long Thanh–Dau Giay Expressway is a  highway in Vietnam. This expressway opened in February 2015, connects Ho Chi Minh City with Thong Nhat, Dong Nai. The estimated investment capital is around 18,000 billion VND (equivalent to US$1.2 billion). The expressway starts at An Phu Intersection, District 2, Ho Chi Minh City and ends at Dau Giay Interchange, Thong Nhat, Dong Nai. At Dau Giay, it ends at a partially completed cloverleaf interchange with the north–south highway. From here, the planned Dau Giay-Dalat Expressway will start. The North-South Expressway will branch of eastbound in the direction of Phan Thiet.

The expressway has five junctions.

References

Transport in Ho Chi Minh City
Expressways in Vietnam
Ho